Hermann-Lenz-Preis was a literary prize of Germany 1999–2009.

Recipients

 1999: Josef W. Janker
 2000: Johannes Kühn
 2001: Ralf Rothmann
 2002: Erich Wolfgang Skwara
 2003: Joseph Zoderer
 2004: Walter Kappacher
 2005: Franz Weinzettl
 2006: Jürgen Becker
 2007: Angela Krauß
 2008: Xaver Bayer
 2009: Friederike Mayröcker

References

 

German literary awards